The Devon Commission (officially 'Commission on Occupation of Land (Ireland)') was a commission that was appointed by Sir Robert Peel to research the problems with land leases. It was formed by a queen's proclamation issued 20 November 1843 and reported 14 February 1845. This was a positive step for the government as it made the Irish believe that reform would come soon afterwards. This was the first time that a British government had taken a step towards reforming the unfair leases.

The Devon Commission was headed by William Courtney, the 10th Earl of Devon, and it reported in 1845 that the population of Ireland had increased from 6 million people to close on 8 million people. Similarly they concluded that the leases were unfair and were favourable to the landowners (who were usually Anglo-Irish). The majority of Irish tenants had no form of protection, they could be, and often were, summarily evicted. They also had no claim to the Ulster Custom of landholding - this would have granted tenants the "3F's": Free sale, fixity of tenure, and fair rent. The Devon Commission had wide reaching consequences and though too late to prevent the famine, it did galvanize change afterwards.

References

 The Irish Problem and How to Solve It, Elibron Classics. Google Books

1840s in Ireland
Land reform in Ireland